Labattoir is a village in the commune of Dzaoudzi on Mayotte, about 4,998 mi (or 8,044 km) south of Paris, the country's capital.

Populated places in Mayotte